Nafkratousa was a Thyella class destroyer that served in the Royal Hellenic Navy (1906-1921).

The ship, along with her three sister ships, was ordered from Britain in 1906 and was built in the Yarrow shipyard at Cubitt Town, London.

During World War I, Greece belatedly entered the war on the side of the Triple Entente and, due to Greece's neutrality the four Thyella class ships were seized by the Allies in October 1916, taken over by the French in November and served in the French Navy 1917–18. By 1918, they were back on escort duty under Greek colors, mainly in the Aegean Sea. Nafkratousa saw action in the Greco-Turkish War (1919-1922).  During maneuvers in that war, Nafkratousa was run aground on the island of Milos and was lost.

See also
History of the Hellenic Navy
Yarrow Shipbuilders

Thyella-class destroyers
Ships built in Cubitt Town
1906 ships
World War I destroyers of Greece
Shipwrecks in the Aegean Sea
Military units and formations of Greece in the Balkan Wars